Corallimorpharia is an order of marine cnidarians closely related to stony or reef building corals (Scleractinia). They occur in both temperate and tropical climates, although they are mostly tropical. Temperate forms tend to be very robust, with wide and long columns, whereas tropical forms tend to have very short columns with a wide oral disc and very short tentacles. The tentacles are usually arranged in rows radiating from the mouth. Many species occur together in large groups, although there are recorded instances of individuals. In many respects, they resemble the stony corals, except for the absence of a stony skeleton. Morphological and molecular evidence suggests that they are very closely related to stony corals. 

Corallimorpharians occur in a wide range of marine habitats, and can be associated with phase shifts in coral reef ecosystems that result in a change from a hard-coral dominated reef to a soft-coral dominated one. They have been observed to overgrow reefs in a carpet formation.  Many species are also common invertebrates kept in marine aquaria.

Taxonomy 
According to World Register of Marine Species, this order contains 46 species within 11 genera:
 Family Corallimorphidae Hertwig, 1882
 Genus Corallimorphus Moseley, 1877 -- 6 species
 Genus Corynactis Allman, 1846 -- 14 species
 Genus Paracorynactis Ocaña, den Hartog, Brito & Bos, 2010 -- 1 species
 Family Discosomidae Verrill, 1869 
 Genus Amplexidiscus Dunn & Hamner, 1980 -- 1 species
 Genus Discosoma Rüppell & Leuckart, 1828 -- 11 species
 Genus Metarhodactis Carlgren, 1943 -- 1 species
 Genus Platyzoanthus Saville-Kent, 1893 -- 1 species
 Genus Rhodactis Milne Edwards & Haime, 1851 -- 7 species
 Family Ricordeidae Watzl, 1922
 Genus Ricordea Duchassaing de Fonbressin & Michelotti, 1860 -- 2 species
 Family Sideractinidae Danielssen, 1890
 Genus Nectactis Gravier, 1918 -- 1 species
 Genus Sideractis Danielssen, 1890 -- 1 species

References

UFL Zoology - Cnidaria

External links 

 
Hexacorallia
Cnidarian orders